Annie Porter, married name Fantham (1880 – 8 May 1963) was an English zoologist and Honorary Parasitologist to the Zoological Society of London.

Life
Annie Porter was the daughter of S. Porter of Brighton. After studying at University College London, she moved to the Quick Laboratory in Cambridge. From 1914 to 1917 she was Beit Memorial Research Fellow at the University of Cambridge. In 1915 she married fellow zoologist Harold Benjamin Fantham (died 1937).

From 1917 to 1933 Porter was Head of the Department of Parasitology at the South African Institute for Medical Research in Johannesburg. She was also Senior Lecturer in Parasitology at the University of the Witwatersrand. From 1933 to 1938 she was a research associate in zoology at McGill University.

She died at St Pancras Hospital in London, and was buried at Mill Road Cemetery in Cambridge.

Works
 (with Harold Benjamin Fantham) 'The structure and homology of the microsporidian spore as seen in Nosema apis', Proceedings of the Cambridge Philosophical Society, Vol, 16, Pt. 7 (1912)
 (with Harold Benjamin Fantham) Some minute animal parasites: or, Unseen foes in the animal world, London: Methuen & Co., 1914
 A survey of the intestinal entozoa, both protozoal and helminthic, observed among natives in Johannesburg, from June to November, 1917, Johannesburg: South African Institute for Medical Research, 1918
 On the effects of cold on the vitality of certain Cysticerci and Echinococci in meat kept under commercial conditions of freezing in Johannesburg, Johannesburg: South African Institute for Medical Research, 1923
 'Surgical & parasitological notes on four cases of intestinal obstruction due to accumulation of very large numbers of round worms : (ascaris lumbricoides)', British Journal of Surgery, Vol. 11, No. 43 (1924), pp. 432–38.
 'Note on a porocephalid found in a shangaan in South Africa', South African Journal of Science, Vol. 25 (December 1928), pp. 359–363.
 'Notes on the Distribution of Animal Parasites in Street Dust examined in Johannesburg from 1923 to 1928', The Journal of the Medical Association of South Africa, 1928
 Some remarks on the hookworm problem in South Africa, Johannesburg : South African Association for the Advancement of Science, 1929
 'Certain animal parasites affecting man in South Africa', The Journal of the Medical Association of South Africa, Vol. 4, pp. 471–74
 The larval Trematoda found in certain South African Mollusca with special reference to schistosomiasis (bilharziasis), Johannesburg: South African Institute for Medical Research, 1938

References

External links
 

1880 births
1963 deaths
20th-century British zoologists
British parasitologists
20th-century South African zoologists
20th-century British women scientists